Leonardo Daniel Ponzio (born 29 January 1982) is an Argentinian former footballer who played mainly as a defensive midfielder.

After starting out at Newell's Old Boys in 2000, he went on to spend his professional career with Zaragoza and River Plate, appearing in 246 competitive matches with the former club and winning the 2004 Copa del Rey, adding several more accolades during his two spells with the latter and going on to be one of the most decorated players in their history.

Club career
Born in Las Rosas, Santa Fe, Ponzio started his career in the youth system of Newell's Old Boys in neighbouring Rosario, going on to make more than 100 official appearances for the club. At only 21, he was signed by Real Zaragoza for the 2003–04 season, for €3 million. After making his La Liga debut on 31 August 2003 in a 0–1 home loss against Deportivo de La Coruña, he went on to become an essential midfield player for the Spanish side, only missing 11 matches over three seasons.

However, when Zaragoza finished sixth in the 2006–07 campaign and qualified to the UEFA Cup, Ponzio had already left, moving in January 2007 to Club Atlético River Plate. He scored his first goal for his new team in the 2007 edition of the Copa Libertadores, against Chile's Colo-Colo.

In January 2009, Ponzio returned to Zaragoza signing a four-and-a-half-year contract, with the club now in the Segunda División. He contributed regularly as the team returned to the top flight immediately.

Ponzio was an ever-present defensive figure in 2009–10, inclusively featuring at right and left-back, while collecting 15 yellow cards. He scored his only goal of the season on 3 April 2010, striking from long range in a 2–0 home win over Málaga CF.

On 4 January 2012, aged 30, Ponzio, whose link in Aragon ran until June, left struggling – in sporting and financial terms – Zaragoza and returned to River Plate for personal reasons, agreeing to a three-and-a-half-year deal.

International career
Ponzio played for Argentina at under-17 and under-20 levels, and earned his first full cap in 2003. In 2001, he played all seven matches (five complete) as the national team won the FIFA U-20 World Cup on home soil.

Career statistics

Club

(1) National Cup refers to Copa Argentina, Copa del Rey , Supercopa Argentina, Copa Superliga and Copa Diego Armando Maradona.

(2) Continental refers to UEFA Europa League, Copa Libertadores, Copa Sudamericana, Recopa Sudamericana, FIFA Club World Cup and Suruga Bank Championship.

Honours
Zaragoza
Copa del Rey: 2003–04

River Plate
Argentine Primera División: Clausura 2008, Torneo Final 2014, Superfinal 2014, Campeonato 2021
Copa Argentina: 2015–16, 2016–17, 2018–19
Supercopa Argentina: 2017, 2019
Copa Libertadores: 2015, 2018
Copa Sudamericana: 2014
Recopa Sudamericana: 2015, 2016, 2019
Suruga Bank Championship: 2015
Primera B Nacional: 2011–12

Argentina U20
FIFA U-20 World Cup: 2001

References

External links

1982 births
Living people
People from Belgrano Department, Santa Fe
Argentine people of Italian descent
Sportspeople from Santa Fe Province
Argentine footballers
Association football midfielders
Association football utility players
Argentine Primera División players
Primera Nacional players
Newell's Old Boys footballers
Club Atlético River Plate footballers
La Liga players
Segunda División players
Real Zaragoza players
Argentina youth international footballers
Argentina under-20 international footballers
Argentina international footballers
Argentine expatriate footballers
Expatriate footballers in Spain
Argentine expatriate sportspeople in Spain